Christ Fellowship is a multi-site, multi-ethnic, megachurch based in Palm Beach Gardens, Florida with more than 28,000 in attendance each week on eleven locations throughout South Florida.

History
Christ Fellowship started in 1984 as a small Bible study with 40 people in Dr. Tom and Donna Mullins' living room and has grown to be one of the largest churches in America. Tom resigned from his job as athletic director at the Palm Beach State College in March 1985 to pursue ministry full-time.

The first church building, which seated 800 people, was converted from a riding stable. Initial plans for a larger campus, located at the intersection of Northlake Boulevard and Gibson Road, were strongly opposed by local residents. However, the Palm Beach Gardens city council allowed the church to be built, based on revised plans including more parking, lower lights, and a wall on its north side.

Led by Pastor Todd and Julie Mullins, Christ Fellowship is based in Palm Beach Gardens, Florida.

Christ Fellowship's Teaching Pastor is Dr. John C. Maxwell,  an internationally respected leadership expert, speaker, and author.The church operates eight campuses in Palm Beach County; additionally, campuses in Port St. Lucie, FL, Vero Beach, FL, and Okeechobee, FL, totalling to twelve (plus their Online Campus).  The church plans on opening a campus in the new municipality of Westlake, Florida.

References

Davisson, Jan. "Palm Beach Gardens Fountain of Youth." PBG Lifestyle Magazine'' Dec. 2008: 38-39. RWW Enterprises, LLC.

External links
 https://christfellowship.church/
 Gardens Campus  
 Royal Palm Campus  
 Stuart Campus  
 CityPlace Campus 

Churches in Palm Beach County, Florida
Evangelical megachurches in the United States
Megachurches in Florida
1984 establishments in Florida